Carolyn Jones (born 1944) is a Canadian politician, who represented the electoral district of Saskatoon Meewasin in the Legislative Assembly of Saskatchewan from 1999 to 2003. She was a member of the Saskatchewan New Democratic Party.

References

Living people
Politicians from Saskatoon
Saskatchewan New Democratic Party MLAs
Women MLAs in Saskatchewan
21st-century Canadian politicians
21st-century Canadian women politicians
1944 births